Acleris denticulosa is a species of moth of the family Tortricidae. It is found in Nepal.

References

Moths described in 1976
denticulosa
Moths of Asia